Lower Talbotstown is a barony in County Wicklow, Republic of Ireland.

Etymology
Lower Talbotstown derives its name from  Talbotstown townland, in Kilbride.

Location

Lower Talbotstown is located in northwest County Wicklow.

History
Lower Talbotstown: Ó Ceallaigh (O'Kelly) of Cualan were also known as chiefs of Uí Máil and their neighbors were the O'Tooles who were driven here across the border of Kildare in the late 12th century by the Normans.
 The original barony was split into upper and lower halves by 1801.

List of settlements

Below is a list of settlements in Lower Talbotstown:
Ballyknockan
Blessington
Donard
Dunlavin
Hollywood

References

Baronies of County Wicklow